The 2005–06 season of the Belgian Jupiler League began on August 5, 2005 and ended on May 5, 2006.  Anderlecht won the title on the last day of competition.

Promoted teams

These teams were promoted from the second division at the start of the season:
S.V. Zulte-Waregem (second division champion)
K.S.V. Roeselare (playoff winner)

Relegated teams
This team was relegated to the second division at the end of the season:
R.A.A. Louviéroise

Final league table

Relegation/Promotion play-off

Results

Top goal scorers

See also
2005–06 in Belgian football

References
 Sport.be website

Belgian Pro League seasons
Belgian
1